GOES-1, designated GOES-A and SMS-C prior to entering service, was a weather satellite, developed by the NASA, operated by the United States National Oceanic and Atmospheric Administration (NOAA). It was the first Geostationary Operational Environmental Satellite (GOES) to be launched.

Launch 

GOES-A was launched atop a Delta 2914 from LC-17B at the Cape Canaveral Air Force Station. The launch occurred at 22:40:00 UTC on 16 October 1975, and left the satellite in a geostationary transfer orbit. Following launch, it raised itself to a geostationary orbit by means of its onboard SVM-5 apogee motor, at which time it was redesignated GOES-1.

Operations 

It was positioned over the Indian Ocean to gather data for the Global Atmospheric Research Program (GARP). GOES-1 was equipped with a Visible Infrared Spin-Scan Radiometer (VISSR), which provided day and night imagery of terrestrial cloud conditions. It returned its first image on 25 October 1975, nine days after launch. The satellite continuously monitored weather events and relayed this meteorological data from over 10,000 surface locations into a central processing center. The data was then incorporated into weather prediction models. It also carried a Space Environment Monitor (SEM) and a Data Collection System (DCS), derived from those used on TIROS satellites.

GOES-1 was replaced by GOES-3, which was launched in 1978. After finishing operations over the Indian Ocean, it was moved to replace SMS-2 over the Pacific Ocean. It remained operational there until 3 February 1985 and it was deactivated by NASA on 7 March 1985.

See also 

 Synchronous Meteorological Satellite (SMS-A, SMS-B)

References

External links 

 NASA's National Science Space Center (NSSDC) satellite ID: 1975-100A

Geostationary Operational Environmental Satellites
Spacecraft launched in 1975